The Ambassador of Malaysia to the Lao People's Democratic Republic is the head of Malaysia's diplomatic mission to Laos. The position has the rank and status of an Ambassador Extraordinary and Plenipotentiary and is based in the Embassy of Malaysia, Vientiane.

List of heads of mission

Chargés d'Affaires to Laos

Ambassadors to Laos

See also
 Laos–Malaysia relations

References 

 
Laos
Malaysia